The 2003 Vengeance was the third annual Vengeance professional wrestling pay-per-view (PPV) event produced by World Wrestling Entertainment (WWE). It was held exclusively for wrestlers from the promotion's SmackDown! brand division. The event took place on July 27, 2003, at the Pepsi Center in Denver, Colorado.

Eight professional wrestling matches were scheduled on the event's card. The main event was a Triple Threat match for the WWE Championship, in which Kurt Angle defeated WWE Champion Brock Lesnar and Big Show to win the championship. Two featured bouts were scheduled on the undercard where WWE Chairman Vince McMahon defeated Zach Gowen and The Undertaker defeated John Cena.

Vengeance had an attendance of approximately 9,500 and received about 322,000 pay-per-view buys. This event helped WWE increase its pay-per-view revenue by $6.2 million from the previous year.

Production

Background
Vengeance was an annual pay-per-view (PPV) event produced by World Wrestling Entertainment (WWE) since 2001. While the 2002 event had featured wrestlers from both the Raw and SmackDown! brands, the 2003 event, however, was promoted as a SmackDown!-exclusive PPV, only featuring wrestlers from that brand. The 2003 event was the third event in the Vengeance chronology and was held on July 27 at the Pepsi Center in Denver, Colorado.

Storylines
The event featured nine professional wrestling matches with outcomes predetermined by WWE script writers. The matches featured wrestlers portraying their characters in planned storylines that took place before, during and after the event. All wrestlers were from the SmackDown! brand - a storyline division in which WWE assigned its employees, with storylines produced on the brand's weekly television show, SmackDown!.

The main event at Vengeance featured WWE Champion Brock Lesnar defending the title against Big Show and Kurt Angle in a Triple Threat match. The buildup to the match began four months prior at WrestleMania XIX, where Lesnar defeated Angle and won the WWE Championship, as Angle underwent neck surgery afterwards. Two months later at Judgment Day, Lesnar defeated Big Show in a stretcher match to retain the title. On the May 29 episode of SmackDown!, Big Show teamed up with Chuck Palumbo and Johnny Stamboli and defeated The Undertaker and Brock Lesnar. On the June 5 episode of  SmackDown!, Angle returned and Big Show attacked him, but Lesnar came to save him and challenge Big Show to a title match. On the June 12 episode of SmackDown!, during the match between Lesnar and Big Show, the ring collapsed, causing the match to end in a no contest. On the June 19 episode of SmackDown!, the two had a rematch but The World's Greatest Tag Team (Shelton Benjamin and Charlie Haas) attacked Lesnar, making Angle and Mr. America to run for the save, only for Big Show to chokeslam all of them. On the June 26 episode of SmackDown!, the six men fought in a tag match where Big Show pinned Mr. America to win the match for his team. On the July 3 episode of SmackDown!, Lesnar and Angle cost Big Show a handicap match against Stephanie McMahon and Zach Gowen. On the July 10 episode of SmackDown!, Big Show chokeslammed Angle and teamed up with The World's Greatest Tag Team to defeat Lesnar. On the July 17 episode of SmackDown!, Angle defeated The World's Greatest Tag Team and Big Show by help from Zach Gowen. On the July 24 episode of SmackDown!, Gowen teamed with both Lesnar and Angle against Big Show and The World's Greatest Tag Team, and Big Show won for his team by chokeslamming both Lesnar and Angle.

One of the featured preliminary matches was Zach Gowen versus Vince McMahon in a singles match. The hype to this match began on the May 22 episode of  SmackDown!, where Gowen, whose left leg was amputated when he was eight years old due to cancer, said that he wanted to wrestle for the WWE. McMahon, however, ordered police to arrest him. On the June 5 episode of SmackDown!, McMahon challenged Gowen to get a WWE contract by beating him in an Arm Wrestling contest. On the June 12 episode of SmackDown!, McMahon kicked Gowen's leg in order to win the contest. On the June 26 episode of SmackDown!, McMahon agreed to give Gowen a contract, but only if Gowen joined McMahon's "Kiss My Ass" club. Gowen low blowed McMahon. McMahon attacked Gowen and booked him and Stephanie McMahon against Big Show, with Gowen getting a WWE contract if they won. On the July 3 episode of SmackDown!, Brock Lesnar and Kurt Angle helped Gowen and Stephanie win the match and earn his contract. On the July 10 episode of SmackDown!, while Gowen signed his contract, McMahon made a match between Gowen and himself for Vengeance. On the July 24 episode of SmackDown!, McMahon attacked Gowen during his match with Lesnar and Angle against Big Show and The World's Greatest Tag Team.

The other featured preliminary match was The Undertaker versus John Cena in a singles match. The buildup to the match began on the June 26 episode of SmackDown!, where Cena celebrated a year in the WWE. He fought Orlando Jordan and defeated him, but attacked him after the match, making Undertaker run down for the save. On the July 3 episode of SmackDown!, Undertaker cost Cena his match against Billy Gunn in the WWE United States Championship tournament. On the July 17 episode of  SmackDown!, Cena and Undertaker brawled in the ring. On the July 24 episode of SmackDown!, Cena taunted Undertaker, rapping about him in a cemetery.

Event

Sunday Night Heat
Before the event aired live on pay-per-view, Último Dragón faced Kanyon on Sunday Night Heat, one of WWE's secondary TV programs. Dragon won after a standing shiranui on Kanyon.

Preliminary matches

As the pay-per-view event began, Eddie Guerrero faced Chris Benoit for the vacant United States Championship. The match was contested evenly between both men, with both of them performing a variety of offensive maneuvers. Guerrero eventually gained the upper hand when Rhyno interfered in the match while the referee was unconscious, performing a Gore on Benoit. After this, Guerrero performed a Frog splash on Benoit to win the title.

In the next match, Billy Gunn (with Torrie Wilson) faced Jamie Noble (with Nidia). If Noble won, he'd get to sleep with Torrie. During the match, Noble performed a DDT from the top turnbuckle on Gunn and went for a cover, but Nidia interfered and placed Gunn's foot on the rope. Noble then angrily confronted Nidia. Torrie attempted to slap him, but he instead kissed her. After this, Nidia and Torrie both slapped Noble. Noble returned to the inside of the ring, only to be tripped by Torrie. While confronting her, Gunn attempted a Gunnslinger but Noble pushed him into Torrie. Noble then rolled-up on Gunn to win.

In the third match, Bradshaw, Faarooq,  Shannon Moore, Doink the Clown, Brother Love, Nunzio, Matt Hardy, Kanyon, Danny Basham, Doug Basham, the Easter Bunny, Sean O'Haire, John Hennigan, Orlando Jordan, Funaki, Los Conquistadores (Rob Conway and Johnny Jeter), the Brooklyn Brawler, Johnny Stamboli, Chuck Palumbo, Matt Cappotelli, and Spanky fought in the APA Invitational Bar Room Brawl. During the match, Spanky was put through a table, Sean O'Haire used a pool cue and Brother Love threw Shannon Moore through a mirror. After knocking down Brother Love, Bradshaw won the match.

In the next match, The World's Greatest Tag Team (Shelton Benjamin and Charlie Haas) faced Rey Mysterio and Billy Kidman for the WWE Tag Team Championship. Throughout the match, both teams performed many offensive maneuvers. The World's Greatest Tag Team won after a combination of a powerbomb by Haas and a diving lariat to retain the titles.

Main event matches
In the fifth match Sable faced SmackDown! General Manager Stephanie McMahon in a No Countout Match. Stephanie attacked Sable while she was on the way to the ring, while Sable utilized kicks to take the advantage. Stephanie beat on Sable on the outside before trying to hit her with a steel chair, but the referee stopped her. The match ended when Stephanie tore away at Sable's top, and while Sable was attempting to get referee Brian Hebner to help her, A-Train attacked Stephanie. Hebner then gave Sable his shirt to cover her, and she covered Stephanie for the win.

In the next match, The Undertaker faced John Cena. The Undertaker controlled the start of the match, but Cena took advantage by drinking water and spraying it in the Undertaker's face. The Undertaker regained control by chokeslamming Cena, before an attempt at a Last Ride. Cena reversed into a DDT, however. The Undertaker was thrown into an exposed turnbuckle and Cena attacked his midsection, bloodying him from the mouth, selling internal injuries, or making them appear realistic. The Undertaker later attempted to perform a Tombstone Piledriver but couldn't due to the (kayfabe) injuries he had received. Cena punched him with a chain wrapped around his fist and delivered an FU. Cena then covered the Undertaker, but he kicked out of the attempt. Cena then scaled the turnbuckle to attack the Undertaker in the corner, but the Undertaker performed the Last Ride on him and pinned Cena for the win.

In the next match, WWE Chairman Vince McMahon faced Zach Gowen. McMahon controlled much of the match, attacking Gowen's leg primarily, as Gowen only has one leg. However, Gowen retaliated with such offensive maneuvers as one-legged dropkicks and springboard backflips. Late in the match, McMahon held a steel chair with the intent of hitting Gowen with it. Gowen, however, countered by using a spinning heel kick to kick the chair into McMahon's face, bloodying him. Gowen then went for a Corkscrew Moonsault, but missed and landed on the mat. McMahon then covered Gowen for the win, but after the match, the crowd gave Gowen a standing ovation for his performance.

In the main event, Brock Lesnar, Kurt Angle and Big Show fought in a Triple Threat Match for the WWE Championship. The match began with Angle and Lesnar facing each other, before attacking the Big Show. Big Show threw Angle outside the ring and chokeslammed Lesnar. He covered Lesnar but didn't score a pinfall. The Big Show controlled the match early on before Lesnar shoulder blocked and went for an F5 but Big Show countered. Angle returned to the ring with trash can lids and both he and Lesnar used them against Big Show. The Big Show tried to chokeslam both men simultaneously, but Angle and Lesnar teamed up to chokeslam Big Show. Later in the match, Angle began to bleed. Big Show placed Lesnar on the top turnbuckle and climbed up to punch Lesnar, but Angle distracted both men and went down to the mat, with Big Show still above him, allowing Lesnar to powerbomb and cover Big Show. Angle broke the cover by hitting Lesnar with a chair to the back, following with a chair shot to the head, bloodying Lesnar, too. Angle and Big Show proceeded to fight outside the ring, and Angle Angle Slammed Big Show on the Spanish announcers' table. Afterward, Lesnar and Angle fought each other back inside the ring, and Lesnar threw Angle to the outside again. The Big Show returned to the ring and chokeslammed Lesnar and Angle simultaneously, and covered both men but couldn't score a pinfall. Angle then placed Lesnar in an ankle lock, but Big Show broke the hold. Angle performed an Angle Slam on Big Show again, and then delivered an Angle Slam to Lesnar, covering him for a pinfall and winning the WWE Title.

Reception
The Pepsi Center has a maximum capacity of 19,000, but that was reduced for Vengeance 2003. The event had an attendance of 9,500. The event resulted in 322,000 pay-per-view buys. The promotion's pay-per-view revenue was $24.7 million. Canadian Online Explorers professional wrestling section rated the entire event an 8.5 out of 10 stars. The No Disqualification Triple Threat main event match was rated a 10 out of 10 stars. The event was released on DVD on August 26, 2003 by Sony Music Entertainment.

Aftermath
While the 2003 Vengeance was a SmackDown!-exclusive PPV, the event became Raw-exclusive the following year. It continued to be promoted as a Raw-exclusive event in 2005 and 2006.

Results

Tournament bracket
The tournament for the vacant WWE United States Championship was held between June 19 and July 27, 2003. The tournament brackets were:

References

External links
Official 2003 Vengeance site

Events in Denver
2003
2003 in Colorado
Professional wrestling shows in Colorado
2003 WWE pay-per-view events
July 2003 events in the United States
WWE SmackDown